Espíritu Santo Cape is a headland in Tierra del Fuego at the eastern entrance of the Strait of Magellan on its southern, opposite Punta Dungeness in the mainland. Espíritu Santo Cape marks the border between Chile and Argentina, and according to the Treaty of Peace and Friendship of 1984 between Chile and Argentina the line between Punta Dungeness and Cabo del Espiritu Santo marks the limits of each country's territorial waters.

External links
 

Landforms of Magallanes Region
Espiritu sato
Headlands of Chile
Isla Grande de Tierra del Fuego
Argentina–Chile border
Strait of Magellan